Talk to Me may refer to:

Film and television 
 Talk to Me (1984 film), an American drama starring Austin Pendleton
 Talk to Me (1996 film), an American television film starring Yasmine Bleeth and Ricky Paull Goldin
 Talk to Me (2006 film), a British documentary by Mark Craig
 Talk to Me (2007 film), an American drama starring Don Cheadle and Chiwetel Ejiofor
 Talk to Me (2022 film), an Australian film directed by the "RackaRacka" twins 
 Talk to Me (American TV series), a 2000 sitcom
 Talk to Me (British TV series), a 2007 four-part drama series

Music

Albums 
 Talk to Me (Joey McIntyre album), 2006
 Talk to Me (Xuxa album), 1994
 Talk to Me: Hits, Rarities & Gems, by Wild Orchid, 2006
 Talk to Me, by Little Willie John, 1958

Songs 
 "Talk to Me" (Babyface song), 1996
 "Talk to Me" (Bahjat song), 2016
 "Talk to Me" (Brandy, Ray J and Willie Norwood song), 2010
 "Talk to Me" (Drakeo the Ruler song), 2021
 "Talk to Me" (Joe Seneca song), originally recorded by Little Willie John (1958), covered by many artists
 "Talk to Me" (Kiss song), 1980
 "Talk to Me" (Nirvana song), 2004
 "Talk to Me" (Peaches song), 2009
 "Talk to Me" (Stevie Nicks song), 1985
 "Talk to Me" (Tory Lanez and Rich the Kid song), 2018
 "Talk to Me" (Wild Orchid song), 1997
 "Talk to Me", by Anita Baker from Compositions, 1990
 "Talk to Me", by Buckcherry from Black Butterfly, 2008
 "Talk to Me", by Carly Rae Jepsen from Curiosity, 2012
 "Talk to Me", by Chico DeBarge from Chico DeBarge, 1986
 "Talk to Me", by Chris de Burgh from Power of Ten, 1992
 "Talk to Me", by Chris Isaak from Silvertone, 1985
 "Talk to Me", by Craig David from The Time Is Now, 2018
 "Talk to Me", by Frank Sinatra, 1959
 "Talk to Me", by Joe Satriani from his self-titled EP, 1984
 "Talk to Me", by Joni Mitchell from Don Juan's Reckless Daughter, 1977
 "Talk to Me", by Mary J. Blige from Growing Pains, 2007
 "Talk to Me", by Nick Brewer, 2015
 "Talk to Me", by Olivia Newton-John from Totally Hot, 1978
 "Talk to Me", by Quarterflash from Back into Blue, 1985
 "Talk to Me", by Red Velvet from Rookie, 2017
 "Talk to Me", by Run the Jewels from Run the Jewels 3, 2016
 "Talk to Me", by Southside Johnny and the Asbury Jukes from Hearts of Stone, 1978; also recorded by its composer, Bruce Springsteen
 "Talk to Me", by Zayn from Icarus Falls, 2018

Other uses 
 Talk to Me (exhibition), a 2011 exhibit at the Museum of Modern Art, New York City
 Talk to Me (NYC), a cultural phenomenon initiated by Bill Wetzel and Liz Barry in 2002

See also